1935 Drexel Dragons football team was head coached by Walter Halas.

Schedule

Roster

References

Drexel
Drexel Dragons football seasons
Drexel Dragons football